50th Street/Washington is a light rail station on the Valley Metro system in Phoenix, Arizona.  It is between 44th Street/Washington and Center Pkwy/Washington stations. The station was built as an infill project to serve the Ability360 recreation center and include disability-friendly features that go beyond federal requirements, such as a more gradual slope and wider platforms. The station opened on April 25, 2019, and cost $22.9 million using funds derived from a light rail initiative passed in 2015.

References

Valley Metro Rail stations in Phoenix, Arizona
Railway stations in the United States opened in 2019